Colli all Metauro is a comune (municipality) in the Province of Pesaro e Urbino in the Italian region Marche. It was created on 1 January 2017 after the merger of the comuni of Montemaggiore al Metauro, Saltara and Serrungarina. The communal seat is at Calcinelli, its largest frazione.

References

Cities and towns in the Marche